Manfred Schumann (born 7 February 1951 in Hanover) is a West German hurdler and bobsledder who competed during the mid to late 1970s. He won two medals at the 1976 Winter Olympics in Innsbruck with a silver in the two-man and a bronze in the four-man events.

Biography
Schumann won a complete set of medals at the FIBT World Championships with a gold in 1974 (Four-man), a silver in 1979 (Two-man, despite being replaced by Fritz Ohlwärter after Schumann's injury during the third heat), and a bronze in 1977.

References
 Bobsleigh two-man Olympic medalists 1932–56 and since 1964
 Bobsleigh four-man Olympic medalists for 1924, 1932–56, and since 1964
 Bobsleigh two-man world championship medalists since 1931
 Bobsleigh four-man world championship medalists since 1930
 DatabaseOlympics.com profile

1951 births
Sportspeople from Hanover
Bobsledders at the 1976 Winter Olympics
German male bobsledders
Olympic bobsledders of West Germany
Olympic bronze medalists for West Germany
Olympic silver medalists for West Germany
Living people
Olympic medalists in bobsleigh
West German male hurdlers
Athletes (track and field) at the 1972 Summer Olympics
Olympic athletes of West Germany
Medalists at the 1976 Winter Olympics